Auburn is an urban neighborhood in the east-central part of Cranston, Rhode Island.

The village contains the Auburn Branch of the Cranston Public Library.

References

Neighborhoods in Rhode Island
Populated places in Providence County, Rhode Island
Cranston, Rhode Island